Géza Kukán (1890–1936) was a Hungarian painter.

Life 
Géza Kukán was born in Érsekújvár (then called Neuhäusel) on 1 May 1890. He studied at the Academy of Fine Arts in Budapest under Ede Balló and Károly Ferenczy from 1908; travelled to Munich in 1910 and studied under Otto Seitz and Carl von Marr until 1911; and continued his training in Nagybánya, Paris, and finally at Gyula Benczúr's school in Budapest.

Kukán painted, in a naturalistic style, mainly figure paintings, genre scenes, and religious subjects. He also worked in book illustration. Several of his works are kept by the Hungarian National Gallery. He died in Budapest on 28 January 1936.

Gallery

References

Sources 

 Wagner-Wilke, Annette (2021). "Kukán, Géza". In Beyer, Andreas; Savoy, Bénédicte; Tegethoff, Wolf (eds.). Allgemeines Künstlerlexikon - International Artist Database - Online. Berlin, New York: K. G. Saur. Retrieved 16 October 2022.
 "Kukán, Géza (1890-1936)". Kieselbach Gallery and Auction House. Retrieved 16 October 2022.

1890 births
1936 deaths
20th-century Hungarian painters